Oscar Saiz (born 15 January 1933) is a Venezuelan former swimmer. He competed in the men's 100 metre freestyle at the 1952 Summer Olympics.

References

1933 births
Living people
Venezuelan male swimmers
Olympic swimmers of Venezuela
Swimmers at the 1952 Summer Olympics
Place of birth missing (living people)
20th-century Venezuelan people